The Community of All Hallows is an Anglican religious order based in Ditchingham, near Bungay, Suffolk, under the jurisdiction of the Church of England.  The religious sisters lead a life of prayer and service providing hospitality and spiritual direction in two retreat house, one in the grounds of their former convent at Ditchingham and another on the Isle of Mull.

History
The Community was founded in 1855 by Lavinia Crosse, daughter of surgeon John Green Crosse with William E. Scudamore an early chaplain.

It announced an intention to close in 2018, subsequently just moving out of the main convent building and satellite retreat house in Norwich.

References

External links

Official website

Anglican orders and communities
Religious organizations established in 1855
Christian religious orders established in the 19th century
Anglican organizations established in the 19th century
1855 establishments in England
Organisations based in Norfolk